MDaemon Email Server is an email server application with groupware functions for Microsoft Windows, first released by Alt-N Technologies in 1996.

Features 
Mdaemon supports multiple client-side protocols, including IMAP, POP3, SMTP/MSA, webmail, CalDAV, CardDAV, and optionally ActiveSync for mobile clients and Outlook, and its Connector for Outlook add-on.

MDaemon's features include a built-in spam filter with Heuristic and Bayesian analysis, SSL and TLS encryption, client-side and server-side email and attachment encryption, public and shared folder support, mailing list, and support for sharing of groupware data (calendar, contacts, tasks & notes). It is also the basis for MDaemon Tech's Security Gateway for Email Servers.

According to SecuritySpace.com's Mail (MX) Server Survey, MDaemon at its peak provided approximately 2.5% of all known Internet mail servers, the sixth largest installation base from all identified servers.

MDaemon Technologies Ransomware Attack 
On October 17, 2022 MDaemon Technologies published on their website customer alert that MDaemon Technologies was the victim of a ransomware cyberattack on Sunday, October 16, 2022. The attack impacted the company's IT systems and website. As a result AV update service and license service were not available impacting some MDaemon customers as users reported on MDaemon facebook page. The AV update and license server was restored on the October 19, 2022. The company was working with the authorities, assessing the impact and working to restore all the affected systems. Their primary goal was to minimize the impact on existing software users. MDaemon Technology employees have had to temporarily switch to manual operations and had to communicate by phone in the U.S. until the systems were up and running.

References

Windows Internet software
Proprietary software
Message transfer agents
Groupware